Harmony Corruption is the third studio album by British grindcore band Napalm Death, released in 1990 on Earache Records.

The style of the album is more death metal than grindcore, featuring extremely heavy riffs and deep low vocals. It was recorded at Morrisound Recording in Tampa, Florida, where many classic death metal albums have been recorded. Florida death metallers Glen Benton from Deicide and John Tardy from Obituary were guest vocalists for the song "Unfit Earth".

The tracks from the Mentally Murdered EP, are included at the end of early editions of the CD, though versions now in print feature only the standard eleven tracks.

It is the first Napalm Death album to feature Mark "Barney" Greenway as the vocalist and Americans Mitch Harris and Jesse Pintado as guitarists, and the last with Mick Harris on drums.

Richard Johnson, a member of Agoraphobic Nosebleed, says that the wide distribution of Harmony Corruption ensured that it had a greater impact on the American grindcore scene than earlier Napalm Death efforts.

Their third UK chart entry, this album peaked at number 67.
Limited vinyl pressing included the bonus LP with live set recorded at I.C.A.

In 2012, Earache Records released remastered edition, containing bonus tracks.

The track "Suffer the Children" was released as single on vinyl and CD, which features the non-album tracks "Siege of Power" and "Harmony Corruption". A video was made for "Suffer the Children".

Track listing

Personnel

Napalm Death
 Mark "Barney" Greenway – vocals
 Jesse Pintado – lead guitar
 Mitch Harris – rhythm guitar
 Shane Embury – bass
 Mick Harris – drums

Additional musicians
 Glen Benton – backing vocals (5)
 John Tardy – backing vocals (5)

Technical personnel
 David Windmill – artwork
 Tim Hubbard – photography
 Noel Summerville – mastering
 Mick Harris – music (5–7, 9–11)
 Shane Embury – songwriting (1, 2, 4), lyrics (3, 7)
 Mark "Barney" Greenway – lyrics (2, 5–11)
 Jesse Pintado – music (3)
 Mitch Harris – music (8)

Chart positions

References

1990 albums
Napalm Death albums
Earache Records albums
Albums produced by Scott Burns (record producer)
Albums recorded at Morrisound Recording